This is a list of foreign players in the Categoría Primera A and the Categoría Primera B. The following players:
have not been capped for the Colombia national team on any level, independently from the birthplace.
have been born in Colombia and were capped by a foreign national team. This includes players who have dual citizenship with Colombia.

In bold: players that currently plays in 2017 season of the Categoría Primera A or the Categoría Primera B, and his current club.
In italics: teams that were in the Categoría Primera B in that year.

Argentina

Armenia

Bolivia

Brazil

Cameroon

Canada

Chile

Costa Rica

Ecuador

El Salvador

England

Equatorial Guinea

Gabon

Guatemala

Honduras

Hungary

Italy

Japan

Mexico

Netherlands

Nicaragua

Nigeria

Palestine

Panama

Paraguay

Peru

Poland

Romania

Scotland

Spain

Switzerland

Timor-Leste

Trinidad and Tobago

United States

Uruguay

Venezuela

Yugoslavia

References

Expatriate footballers in Colombia
Colombia
Association football player non-biographical articles